St. Alban's Episcopal Church is an Episcopal church located at 580 Hilgard Avenue in Westwood, Los Angeles, California.

Overview
St. Alban's was first established as a mission of the Los Angeles, given its proximity to the University of California, Los Angeles.

The church building was designed by architect Percy Parke Lewis (1885-1962) in 1930-1931. It was named after Saint Alban, and it was dedicated to Joseph Horsfall Johnson (1895-1928), who served as the first Episcopal Bishop of Los Angeles. Reverend John A. Bryant, the first vicar, conducted the first service on Christmas Eve, December 24, 1931. 
 It was elevated to parish status on January 25, 1941.

Actor Paul Le Mat and producer Suzanne de Passe were married in this church. The memorial service of Edward W. Carter (1911-1996) was also conducted here. So was the memorial service of director Howard Hawks (1896-1977).

References

Episcopal church buildings in Los Angeles
Episcopal church buildings in California
Westwood, Los Angeles
Churches completed in 1931